Shahabeddin Gordan (born May 22, 1984) is an Iranian Football goalkeeper who plays for Foolad in the Persian Gulf Pro League and the Iran national football team.

Club career
Shahab Gordan joined Zob Ahan F.C. in 2009 after spending his entire career with F.C. Aboomoslem. Since he joined Zob Ahan F.C., he has been first-choice goalkeeper, he played almost every match in the IPL, and his performance helped to secure 2nd place on the 2009–10 IPL. Shahab Gordan also played every match in the 2010 Asian Champions League and made very important saves to lead Zob Ahan F.C. to the ACL final, including saving a penalty from Christian Wilhelmsson, against Saudi power-house Al-Hilal in the semi-finals. He signed a one-year contract with Persepolis in 2012. In the end of the 2012 season, Shahab signed with Iranian champions Sepahan, as he only played 5 games while representing Persepolis.

Club career statistics

International career
Shahab Gordan's recent performances while in Zob Ahan F.C. goal, impressed many Team Melli fans, which made Iran national team coach Afshin Ghotbi calling him to the national team. Shahab is a member of the Iran national team. He made his debut on 19 January 2011, in a 2011 AFC Asian Cup match against United Arab Emirates. He was one of the 23 players in the Iran national team in the 2011 AFC Asian Cup. He is usually second choice goalkeeper behind Mehdi Rahmati.

Honours
Zob Ahan
Iran Pro League Runner-up: 2009–10
AFC Champions League Runner-up: 2010

Sepahan
Iran Pro League (1): 2014–15
Hazfi Cup (1): 2012–13

References

External links
Shahab Gordan at PersianLeague.com
Shahab Gordan at TeamMelli.com
Shahab Gordan's Profile in 18ghadam.ir

 

1984 births
Living people
Zob Ahan Esfahan F.C. players
Iranian footballers
F.C. Aboomoslem players
Nassaji Mazandaran players
2011 AFC Asian Cup players
Sepahan S.C. footballers
Shahr Khodro F.C. players
Persepolis F.C. players
Sanat Naft Abadan F.C. players
Persian Gulf Pro League players
Iran international footballers
Sportspeople from Mazandaran province
Association football goalkeepers
People from Juybar
21st-century Iranian people